Urosalpinx ortmanni is an extinct species of sea snail, a marine gastropod mollusk in the family Muricidae, the murex snails or rock snails.

Description
This species resembles † Urosalpinx archipatagonica Ihering 1907, found at the same location.

Distribution
Fossils were found in Early Miocene strata of Patagonia, Argentina (age range: 23.03 to 15.97 Ma).

References

 H. Ihering. 1907. Les Mollusques fossiles du Tertiare et du Crétacé supérieur de l' Argentine. Anales Museo Nacional de Buenos Aires 15(3):1-611
 Cossmann (M.), 1899 - Description de quelques coquilles de la formation Santa Cruzienne en Patagonie. Journal de Conchyliologie, t. 47, vol. 3, p. 223-242 pl. 10, fig. 7)

External links
 

ortmanni
Miocene gastropods